Color Wonder is a product made by Crayola, primarily intended for use by younger children, in which the special clear-ink marker only appears on the Color Wonder paper. Originally made with markers and paper, Color Wonder has also made specialty products including paints, etc. The Color Wonder products debuted in 1993. Color Wonder paints and fingerpaints, as well as Color Wonder coloring books of popular characters such as Disney Pixar's Cars and Disney Princess also exist.

The 'magic' clear-ink products were designed so that toddlers and young children don't stain their clothes, paint on the walls, etc.  Crayola has a patent under Binney & Smith relating to this kind of mess-free marking system. An applicator, such as a felt pen, uses a composition containing a colorless leuco dye that changes to color in the presence of acid. The substrate in the Color Wonder paper contains zinc ions which trigger the development of color in the dyes when the marker inks are applied. The zinc ions act as Lewis acids to drive the color-changing chemical reaction.

There is also another line similar to this one by Crayola, but marketed towards older children, called Color Explosion. It is like Color Wonder, except there is not only one color hidden in the paper, but stripes, dots, and swirls of a variety of colors, depending on the package you get (Fire & Ice, Twisted Tropicals, etc.) It is also available in black and white paper.

References

Picture of system
Product Page Patent

Crayola